Chimid Balzanov was a Buddhist priest of Kalmyk origin who was elected religious head of the Kalmyks by leaders of the Kalmyk community at a Kalmyk Congress, which assembled after the February Revolution on March 25, 1917 and on July 23–25, 1917 to discuss spiritual, cultural, and economic issues.

Tibetan Buddhist priests from Kalmykia
Year of birth missing
Year of death missing
Buddhists from the Russian Empire